Patralekha (born 20 February 1990) is an Indian actress. She made her acting debut with CityLights alongside Rajkummar Rao for which she won Screen Award for Most Promising Female Newcomer.

Paul made her web debut with the 2017 ALT Balaji's series Bose: Dead/Alive.

Early life 
Patralekha was born in Shillong, Meghalaya, in a Bengali family, to a Chartered Accountant father and a homemaker mother Papri Paul. In an interview, she stated that her grandmother was a poet. She has two siblings Parnalekha Paul and Agnish Paul. She went to The Assam Valley School, a boarding school, and then graduated from Bishop Cotton Girls' School, Bangalore. Her father wanted her to follow in his footsteps, but she was interested in acting. While studying in H.R. College of Commerce and Economics she did a few commercials for Blackberry, and Tata Docomo, before getting a break in films.

Personal life 
Patralekha has been in a relationship with  actor Rajkummar Rao since 2010. On November 15, 2021 the couple got married in a traditional Hindu wedding at The Oberoi Sukhvilas Spa Resort in Chandigarh, India.

Career 
Patralekha made her film debut with a leading role in the drama CityLights, opposite Rajkummar Rao. Directed by Hansal Mehta, the film tells the story of a poor couple living in Rajasthan who move to Mumbai in search of livelihood. Made on a low budget, the film became a commercial success and earned her positive reviews from critics. 

Her next film, Love Games, was an urban-thriller directed by Vikram Bhatt and produced by Mukesh Bhatt and Mahesh Bhatt. The cast of the film included Patralekha, Gaurav Arora and Tara Alisha Berry.

Filmography

Films

Web series

Awards and nominations

References

External links 

 
 
  

1989 births
Living people
Indian film actresses
People from Shillong
Actresses from Meghalaya
Screen Awards winners